Ruther Cross is the shaft of an old stone cross in Guisborough in Redcar and Cleveland, England.  It stands close to the point where the old road Ruthergate used to cross Hutton Lane. The cross was designated Grade II listed in April 1984.

References

 

Archaeological sites in North Yorkshire
Buildings and structures in North Yorkshire
High crosses in England
Grade II listed buildings in North Yorkshire
Guisborough